Aber Valley Football Club is a Welsh football team based in Abertridwr, Caerphilly, Wales. They play in the South Wales Alliance League Premier Division, which is in the fourth tier of the Welsh football league system. They were champions of Division One for the 2019–20 season.

History
A club called Aber Valley played in the Welsh Football League Division Two East for the 1963–64 season, finishing tenth, and gained promotion to Division One (tier 2) at the end of the 1966–67 season after finishing third in Division Two. After one season in Division One, where they finished bottom of the league, the club left the Welsh Football League. They were South Wales Amateur League Division Two champions in the 1970–71 season.

The current club were formed in 2000 as Aber Valley YMCA and played in the South Wales Amateur League Division Two. In 2003–04 they had seven points deducted which cost them the Division Two championship title. The following season they did finish as champions  They were runners-up of Division One for the 2006–07 season.

In 2015 the club changed its name to Aber Valley. They were champions of Division One for the 2019–20 season and were promoted to the Premier Division.

Honours

Welsh Football League Division Two A – Champions: 1923–24. 
South Wales Alliance League Division One: – Champions: 2019–20
South Wales Amateur League Division One: – Runners-up:  2006–07
South Wales Amateur League Division Two: – Champions:  1970–71; 2004–05

References

External links
Club official twitter
Club official facebook

Football clubs in Wales
South Wales Alliance League clubs
South Wales Amateur League clubs
Welsh Football League clubs
Sport in Caerphilly County Borough